Võ Duy Dương (武維楊; 1827–1866), also Thiên Hộ Dương (千戶楊) was a Vietnamese warlord who, after the submission of the Vietnamese government to the French in 1862, continued to fight against the French (1862-1866) in the wetlands of Đồng Tháp Mười, where he died of disease.

References

1827 births
1866 deaths
Vietnamese nationalists
Vietnamese revolutionaries
People of the Cochinchina campaign